Bhaktinagar railway station is a small railway station in Rajkot district, Saurastra. Its code is BKNG. It serves Rajkot city. The station consists of 3 platforms. The platform is not well sheltered. It lacks many facilities including water and sanitation.

Major trains 

 Somnath–Okha Express
 Somnath Superfast Express
 Rajkot–Somnath Passenger
 Rajkot–Porbandar Express
 Rajkot–Veraval Passenger
 Thiruvananthapuram–Veraval Express
 Ahmedabad–Somnath Intercity Express
 Porbandar–Santragachi Kavi Guru Express
 Saurashtra Mail
 Somnath–Jabalpur Express (via Bina)
 Somnath–Jabalpur Express (via Itarsi)

See also 

 
 Rajkot–Somnath line

References

Railway stations in Rajkot district
Rajkot railway division
Transport in Rajkot